KLKC-FM (93.5 FM, "V93") is a radio station broadcasting an adult hits format. Licensed to Parsons, Kansas, United States, it serves the Pittsburg area. The station is currently owned by Wayne Gilmore, Kirby Ham and Greg Chalker, through licensee Parsons Media Group, LLC.

Previous logo
 (KLKC-FM's logo under previous "Max FM" branding)

References

External links

Adult hits radio stations in the United States
LKC-FM